Minister van Staat (Dutch) means "Minister of State".
 Minister of State (Netherlands)
 Minister of State (Belgium)